Tucca is a genus of parasitic copepods in its own family, Tuccidae, in the order Poecilostomatoida.

References 

Poecilostomatoida
Crustacean genera
Taxa named by Henrik Nikolai Krøyer